Vampires is a soundtrack by John Carpenter for the 1998 film of the same name. It was released in 1998 through Milan Records.

Track listing

Personnel
The Texas Toad Lickers
 John Carpenter - keyboards, piano, guitar, bass
 Steve Cropper - guitar
 Jeff Baxter - electric guitar, resonator guitar, pedal steel guitar
 Donald "Duck" Dunn - bass
 Rick Shlosser - drums
 Bruce Robb - Hammond B3 organ 
 Joe Robb - saxophone

Stone
 Brad Wilson - vocals, guitar
 Brian James - bass
 J.J. Garcia - drums

Additional personnel
 Daniel Davies - guitar
 Cody Carpenter - keyboards
 E. "Bucket" Baker - drums, percussion 
 Paul Mirkovich - orchestra conductor

References

John Carpenter soundtracks
1998 soundtrack albums
Milan Records soundtracks
Western film soundtracks
Action film soundtracks
Horror film soundtracks